Modaspor basketball team is the amateur basketball department of the Turkish sports club Modaspor, based in the district of Kadıköy, Istanbul. The team competes in the Istanbul Men's Amateur League.

History
The basketball team of Modaspor was founded in 1946 and soon became one of the most successful Turkish basketball teams in the 1950s. The club managed to win the Turkish Basketball Championship in 1954, 1955, and 1958 and won the Istanbul Basketball League in the 1958–59 season. Modaspor became the first Turkish club to represent Turkey in the inaugural season of the newly founded FIBA European Champions Cup.

Honours
Turkish Championship
 Winners (3): 1954, 1955, 1958
 Runners-up (1): 1959
Istanbul League
 Winners (1): 1958–59

External links
Official website

 Basketball teams established in 1946
1946 establishments in Turkey
 Basketball teams in Turkey